Govan railway station was a railway station in Govan, a district of Glasgow, Scotland. The station was originally part of an extension to the Glasgow and Paisley Joint Railway.

History
The station opened on 2 December 1868. During the station's lifetime it was closed several times: between 1 July 1875 and 1 March 1880, April 1899 and May 1902, and between May 1906 and January 1911. The station closed permanently to regular passenger services on 9 May 1921.

The Glasgow Subway's Broomloan Depot is near to the site of Govan station, and uses part of the old trackbed as a test track.

Footnotes

References
Butt, R.V.J. (1995). The Directory of Railway Stations, Patrick Stephens Ltd, Sparkford. .

Disused railway stations in Glasgow
Former Glasgow and Paisley Joint Railway stations
Railway stations in Great Britain opened in 1868
Railway stations in Great Britain closed in 1921
Govan